Emotion (stylized as E•MO•TION) is the third studio album by Canadian singer and songwriter Carly Rae Jepsen. It was released on June 24, 2015, in Japan and on August 21, 2015, worldwide through 604, School Boy, and Interscope Records. Looking to transition from the bubblegum pop-oriented nature of her second studio album, Kiss (2012), Jepsen found inspiration in 1980s music and alternative styles. She enlisted a team of mainstream and indie collaborators, including Sia, Mattman & Robin, Dev Hynes, Ariel Rechtshaid, Rostam Batmanglij, Greg Kurstin, and Peter Svensson of the Cardigans, culminating in a largely synth-pop-centric effort.

Emotion received generally favorable reviews from contemporary music critics, who praised its pop escapism, but were divided over its lyrical content. The album underperformed worldwide, debuting at number sixteen on the Billboard 200 with 16,153 units. However, in Jepsen's home country, it became her third top ten, peaking at number eight in Canada with 2,600 copies. The album fared better in Japan, debuting at number eight with 12,189 physical copies sold and subsequently being certified Gold by the Recording Industry Association of Japan (RIAJ) for shipments exceeding 100,000 copies.

The album was preceded by the release of its lead single, "I Really Like You", which reached top five in several territories including the United Kingdom and Japan. It was followed by "Run Away with Me" and "Your Type", the former of which found renewed interest as an internet meme. Jepsen embarked on the Gimmie Love Tour in support of the album in November 2015, with a second leg commencing in February 2016. In April 2016, she toured Canada in support of the album as the opening act for Hedley on their Hello World Tour.

In lieu of commercial success, Emotion reinvigorated Jepsen's career as an "indie darling", garnering her a cult following. The album was shortlisted for the 2016 Polaris Music Prize. A companion EP entitled Emotion: Side B (2016) was released on its first anniversary and features eight songs that were cut from the original project.

Background
Following the sudden worldwide success of "Call Me Maybe" in 2012, Jepsen found that the song had become "[this] huge, ginormous thing that really overshadowed the rest of our project" and further singles issued from Kiss failed to gain traction. Jepsen viewed her predicament as an opportunity to retract from the spotlight and contemplate the direction of her next album. She met with her record label and management after The Summer Kiss Tour wrapped up in late 2013, stating: I want you to put your faith in me that I'll come back when it's ready,' and they did and I'm very lucky to have a team that wasn't about trying to mass produce things and was really more looking at the quality of it."

Jepsen spent time regrouping; searching for a "detour" that came to be in the form of a Broadway role: "I thought, how amazing would it be to take a left turn, somehow, and still come back to this? [...] but 'left turn'—I didn't know what that meant." She was approached by the producers of Rodgers + Hammerstein's Cinderella to audition for the titular character, and was formally offered the part after auditioning in Los Angeles and passing callbacks in New York. Jepsen assumed the role for twelve weeks from February 2014 to June 2014, and during this time she decided to handle her own A&R. With help from guitarist Tavish Crowe, Jepsen began emailing artists she admired to see if they were interested in collaborating, including Tegan and Sara, Rostam Batmanglij of Vampire Weekend and Shellback.

Under the pressure of matching "Call Me Maybes success, Jepsen recorded an entire indie-folk album during her run on Cinderella as an act of "rebellion". Jepsen felt that the demo project was developed for the wrong reasons–out of superficiality–and it was ultimately scrapped: "I think there is a natural rebellion when you have success in one area to completely rebel against that. I needed to get that out of my system, I think. I made really weird music." Jepsen's work on Cinderella provided valuable perspective in terms of being defined by a single attribute, particularly from her costar Fran Drescher: "Everyone still calls her 'the Nanny'. I realized you can't give in to other people's perception of you. Everyone's gonna be known for something.""[Emotion] had to not be about trying to prove something. I feel like if you're writing music just to have a different identity in the public's eye, it's sort of the wrong motive. It's gotta be coming from a place of what you love and what you're passionate about."

Writing and development 
Due to her dissatisfaction with Kiss's constrained timeframe of two months, Jepsen went into Emotion with the intent of crafting a project that was authentic and allowed her to approach different avenues. Whereas Kiss was developed in an acquiescent manner, as Jepsen was simply grateful for the opportunity, Emotion was spurred by her desire to take more creative control. Jepsen commented that much of the album is about "trying to get some power back" after exiting a relationship and subsequently settling down in New York. She sought to channel a "heart-on-your-sleeve sensibility" reminiscent of 1980s pop music after attending a Cyndi Lauper concert in Japan. These themes were further explored through "old-school" Prince and Madonna records on morning runs before Cinderella rehearsals: "What I loved was how potent some of those [1980s] lyrics were—how heart wrenching, how everyone's tea leaves are just right there on their sleeve. In music today, everything is a little more coy, but I wanted that romance and that fantasy, and I think that a lot of people [my] age do."

An epiphany came to Jepsen after finishing "Emotion", the album's title track, where she found that a 1980s pop sound, combined with a more "alternative" production, was what she had been seeking. This fashioned the album's direction entirely–Emotion developed as a midway point between the "pure" pop she recorded in Los Angeles and the indie-folk effort that was scrapped in New York.

Jepsen combed through Dev Hynes' discography after becoming infatuated with "Losing You" by Solange, to which she found his name listed in its production credits. Jepsen sought to collaborate, stating she was a fan, which Hynes hesitated to believe. He was eventually "won over" by Jepsen's demonstration of her vocal ability and work ethic, and credited her with genuine intentions of "[developing] a new aesthetic" versus pursuing "Pitchfork-approved artists" for the sake of indie credibility. The pair worked in a Chelsea studio between Jepsen's Cinderella performances. Hynes sent a demo of what would become "All That", where Jepsen wrote the bridge and produced the vocals herself. Ariel Rechtshaid was brought in for additional work on the song. In a similar affair, Jepsen's admiration of Sky Ferreira's work led her to Rechtshaid and the pair began meeting for coffee dates, figuring out a session date as he was in the midst of producing with Brandon Flowers. Rechtshaid further contributed to Emotion by aiding in the selection process of its track list and finalizing the production on its closer, "When I Needed You".

Rostam Batmanglij was a prior fan of Jepsen's work when he reached out to her in the summer of 2014, after learning that she was in Los Angeles writing with various people. Jepsen was "over the moon" and the pair developed "Warm Blood" over the next year, the first verse recorded as Jepsen sat on the carpet of Batmanglij's home studio. Batmanglij announced the track's existence via Twitter on April 29, 2015.

Jepsen spent a month in Sweden recording for the album, per her label's suggestion. These sessions materialized in its lead single "I Really Like You", written with Peter Svensson of the Cardigans, "Your Type" with Rami Yacoub and Carl Falk, and the Mattman & Robin-produced "Run Away with Me" which developed over two separate trips to the country. The duo flew to Los Angeles for one last session with Jepsen, finishing "Gimmie Love" in a day.

Prior to starting full-fledged work on Emotion, Jepsen had sketched several of its demos on her tour bus as she supported Kiss back in 2013. Of these, "Boy Problems" would eventually finalize its form with Sia and Greg Kurstin. Sia wrote the bridge to "Boy Problems", and contributed the outside cut "Making the Most of the Night", which Sia originally developed with the members of Haim. "I Didn't Just Come Here to Dance" existed as early as 2011 according to matching lyrics on a tweet authored by Jepsen. It would eventually be presented to Max Martin after the pair finished work on "Tonight I'm Getting Over You" in 2012; intending to cease their session at midnight, the song compelled Martin to stay for two extra hours. It was confirmed that she had worked with Josh Ramsay, Ryan Stewart, Benny Blanco and Stargate, though none of these producers appeared on the finalized project. A total of 250 songs were composed over the course of the album's development. Speaking to the Herald, Jepsen stated that she worked on Emotion past deadline and finished right before its Japan release date on June 24, 2015.

Composition and lyrics 
Emotion contains elements of synth-pop and new wave. Consequence of Sound summed the record up as a "more mature, sophisticated version of her [Kiss] hyperpop", Jepsen elaborating: "I wanted to kind of blur the lines of what [a pop album] needed to be." She found it a challenge to repurpose the album's 80s influences into a modern context without delving into "empty nostalgia", stating that the album is not strictly a "period piece", but is "tinted with shades of that era".  The lyrics on Emotion "shade her old ebullience with darker, more complex feelings", and it is sonically grounded with "earthier textures" from 80s R&B–cleansing herself of the Cinderella performances during the record's production. Elsewhere, Jepsen explores funk and disco on "Boy Problems", and house music on "I Didn't Just Come Here to Dance".

Jepsen singled "All That" out as most representative of the goals she sought to accomplish with Emotion. Lyrically: "['All That'] holds a special place in my heart because it is so revealing: It's talking about the desire for intimacy with somebody. And I think with songs like 'Call Me Maybe', that can be quite light and a little bit more surfacey, it's fun to get a little deeper." Jepsen penned "Your Type" with Rami Yacoub and Carl Falk at four in the morning when she was "losing her mind": "They got me hooked for a week on those little fake cigarettes that taste of strawberries. You can hear it in my voice, I sound all gritty. It's because I was vaping for a week."

"Warm Blood" was produced by Rostam Batmanglij and co-written with Tino Zolfo and Joe Cruz. It initially held the hook "warm love feels good" to which Batmanglij misheard as "warm blood", sticking as its main motif as he was drawn to its physical rather than abstract connotations. Jepsen explained: "The more we chipped away at it, we couldn't get away from how much better 'blood' felt and how realer it was. It's almost like that warm skin or that feeling of intimacy." The song has been noted for its experimental vocal effects, with Batmanglij scattering distorted vocal cuts throughout, a "creepy" quality that the pair immediately liked. Elsewhere, sections of "Warm Blood" were sung in a lower pitch; Jepsen was to re-record these parts as she came to the session with "shot vocals", however its "smokier" quality abandoned these plans. Brad Nelson of The Guardian compared Jepsen's performance to that of Ezra Koenig's "machine-produced flexibility" on the Vampire Weekend song, "Diane Young".

In a session with Tavish Crowe, the closer "When I Needed You" was written to process a break up where Jepsen realizes the faults of her seemingly "perfect" relationship: "[...] but in order to stay in it, I would have to be quite a different person than who I naturally am [...] and that sacrifice didn't seem worth it in the end." Dan Nigro and Nate Campany composed the "happier-sounding" instrumental, to which Jepsen felt a sense of catharsis in concealing a "very serious" emotion. Ariel Rechsthaid reworked the chord progression in order to invoke a sense of "desperation", droning through it with a series of bell notes that made the composition sound "a little bit more somber". The "five-string, funk-R&B" bass line was played by Ethan Farmer, and the drum fill, "an 80s kind-of snare with a big reverb on it," was inspired by John Mellencamp's "Jack & Diane".

"When I'm Alone", a song written and co-composed by Jepsen during sessions for Emotion, was eventually purchased by SM Entertainment and given to K-pop girl group f(x) for their album 4 Walls. "Cut to the Feeling" and "Runaways", both written by Jepsen during sessions for Emotion, were recorded for the soundtrack of the 2016 film Ballerina. "Wildflowers", a song written during the sessions for Emotion which leaked online in 2016, was covered by Elle Fanning for the soundtrack of the film Teen Spirit (2018).

Title and artwork 
Eternal Summer was a running contender for the album's title, in reference to Los Angeles being an "eternal summer in sunshine" where time perspective is lost. It originated from the song "Eternal Summer" which Jepsen developed for a scrapped indie-folk effort; the song was ultimately cut from Emotion as well. Per suggestion from her A&R, the song "Emotion" was retrofitted as the album's title as Jepsen was fond of its strength, both as a one-word title and its complexity as a concept. Jepsen further stated that the song "Emotion" itself encapsulated her feelings of clarity, as its writing process steered her in the direction of 80s emotional pop". Jepsen was "sold" on the title Emotion after she was sent its phonetic spelling, which is reflected in its stylization (E·MO·TION).

The album artwork features Jepsen sitting in a reserved position as she dons a technicolor sweater and black tights: "There were a few different pictures that had more of a decided facial expression, but I kind of liked the fact that I can't totally read what I was thinking in that picture. It could be many things, and this album, to me, was sort of a collection of many different emotions." The artwork's typography bears the dictionary entry of "Emotion" as a noun.

Release and promotion

Jepsen announced the title of the album on April 11, 2015, and released the cover artwork on April 15, 2015. The track listing was unveiled on June 2, 2015. The album's lead single, "I Really Like You", was released to the iTunes Store on March 2, 2015. The song reached the top 40 in Australia, Canada, Japan, and Netherlands, and has reached number 39 on the US Billboard Hot 100, number 3 in Ireland and on the UK Singles Chart, and number 1 on the Scottish Singles Chart. The music video was released on March 6, 2015, featuring Tom Hanks and Justin Bieber. The album's promotion was kicked off with a live performance of "Really Like You" at Good Morning America on March 5, 2015. "All That" was issued as the first promotional single on April 5, 2015. The following day, Jepsen performed the track at Saturday Night Live.
On May 1, 2015, Jepsen performed "Run Away with Me", "Emotion", "Your Type", "Black Heart" and "Gimmie Love" at a show in Beijing, China. The album's title-track was released on June 3, 2015. "Run Away with Me" and "Your Type" also premiered on a Spanish radio station prior to the album's release on June 22, 2015. "Run Away with Me" was released as the album's second single on July 17, 2015. The music video for "Run Away with Me" was released on July 17, 2015 and directed by Jepsen’s former boyfriend, David Kalani Larkins. The video was filmed in Tokyo, New York City, and Paris. The track was premiered on Hit FM in Spain on June 22, 2015. "Warm Blood" was released as the second promotional single on July 31, 2015. "Making the Most of the Night" was released as the third promotional single on August 7, 2015. "Your Type" was released as the fourth promotional single on August 14, 2015.

On August 21, the release date of Emotion in the United States, Jepsen performed "Run Away with Me" on Today. During her tour in South Africa in October 2015, she performed "Run Away With Me" on Idols South Africa. "Your Type" was re-released as the third official single on November 9, 2015, in Europe. An official remix package was released on December 11, 2015, in Europe and Oceania and on December 18, 2015, in North America. Its music video, directed by Gia Coppola, premiered November 3, 2015, and follows Jepsen on a Cinderella-inspired story where her character fantasizes about becoming a pop star.

A music video for "Boy Problems" premiered on April 8, 2016. It was directed by Petra Collins and stars Tavi Gevinson, Barbie Ferreira, Paloma Elsesser, among others.

Critical reception

Emotion received positive reviews from music critics. At Metacritic, which assigns a normalized rating out of 100 to reviews from mainstream publications, the album received an average score of 77, based on 24 reviews. The album was praised for its "pop perfection" in catchiness, cohesion and production value. Sasha Geffen of Consequence of Sound wrote, "Few artists have taken a logarithmic hit like "Call Me Maybe" as a sign to push even further, to make something better, more human, and more electric. But Jepsen is the kind of singer who thrives on the stakes that unapologetic pop music offers." Annie Zaleski of The A.V. Club said, "If there's any justice, Emotion will propel her to superstardom—but even if it doesn't, she can at least rest easy knowing she made one of 2015's most interesting, effervescent records." Peter Tabakis of Pretty Much Amazing stated that "Emotion is so good, it's formed sky-high expectations out of thin air." Slant Magazine's James Rainis writes, "Emotion is further proof that Jepsen is capable of translating broadly understood emotions and experiences into unshakable earworms."

Opinion was divided over the album's lyrical content, which some reviewers have deemed as immature or bland. Corban Goble of Pitchfork commented, "It's unfair to deeply scrutinize lyrics on a pop record—the goal is to write smart, but skew broad—but Emotion fails to tell us who Jepsen is or wants to be." Her "absence of an identity" was further compared to her contemporaries for their image-conscious work. While Adam Downer of cokemachineglow opines that the album's "retro-pop bliss without angle or ego lends it a refreshingly timeless quality", further contexualizing it [in] "a year where pop stars fight for brand supremacy"; Alexis Petridis of The Guardian states that the issue isn't Jepsen being without an "outrageous, headline-grabbing persona" like Rihanna or Miley Cyrus but that "she doesn't do anything to stamp her identity on the songs [...] It's one problem that all the expensive names in the credits can't solve." Similarly, Jon Caramanica of The New York Times scrutinizes the heavy-lifting done by Emotion's cast of collaborators: "Maybe Ms. Jepsen's choices merely reinforce the new centrist pop model of ’80s sleekness [...]; but why fall under the spell of someone else's cool when you can luxuriate in the stink of your own cheese?"

In a more negative review, Billy Hamilton of Under the Radar critiques the poptimism narrative surrounding Jepsen and her perceived effort to appease "indie tastemakers", regarding her as "the pet project of a creative hipsterati that's determined to prove pop is cooler than you, or I, could possibly ever imagine," further expressing that "Carly Rae Jepsen and her production team try overly hard to be clever." In a similar conclusion, Evan Sawdey of PopMatters writes that "Emotion is still a very pleasing album if not just a shade overambitious, clearly trying too hard to make the same genius pop moments that Kiss churned them out with effortless flair."

Select year-end lists

Decade-end lists

Commercial performance
The album debuted at number 16 on the US Billboard 200, earning 16,153 album sales in its first week. By the end of 2015, Emotion had sold a total of 36,000 copies. In Canada, the album debuted at number 8 with 2,600 copies sold in its first week. In Japan, the album debuted at number 8 with 12,189 physical copies sold in its first week. On April 2, 2016, Jepsen revealed via Twitter that Emotion was certified gold by the Recording Industry Association of Japan, having sold over 100,000 copies there, these copies represent physical sales of the album only. The album entered the UK Albums Chart on September 25 at number 21 with sales of 4,150 copies in addition to streaming figures.

Legacy
Emotion is considered a crucial factor in Jepsen's "unlikely" career trajectory, following her stint on Canadian Idol and the ubiquity of "Call Me Maybe" to "cult idol". Marked as a transitional piece, publications commended Jepsen for cultivating her sound, which "[reestablished] herself as a pop star for grown-ups". Carrie Battan of the New Yorker posed that Emotion spared Jepsen from "falling to her death" and instead descended her to the bottom akin to a rising "mindie" artist, online buzz and "underground cred" in tow: "Jepsen, the woman behind one of the biggest songs of this century, now resembles someone whom she never had the opportunity to become at the beginning: an indie darling."

Emotion was labelled a "commercial flop" as its promotional cycle waned. James Rettig of Stereogum writes, "The lead-up to Emotion played out like a lesson in what not to do with a pop singer sitting precariously on the edge between cultural ubiquity and cult following." Some blamed its promotional roll-out, with a Japanese release arriving two months ahead and therefore susceptible to leaks. Elsewhere, others focused on creative choices–Rettig criticized "I Really Like You" as lead single, the "most damaging misstep" that hindered Jepsen's ability to showcase her artistic growth. FasterLouders Jules LeFevre noted that Jepsen's decision against promoting any archetypal identity rendered herself "indistinct" in the "crowded pop landscape".

The record grew to become a cult hit with Jepsen labelled as an "underdog" as it spread by word-of-mouth. Whereas music critics were "compelled by the narrative of a one-hit wonder trying to rebuild herself", as quipped by Battan, Caitlin White of Uproxx writes, "I think Emotion wouldn't be as meaningful if we had to share it with capitalism's steely machinery; its commercial failure is part of what makes it continue to feel intimate, ours." Emotion is noted for garnering Jepsen a large LGBTQ audience, Brandon Tensley of Pacific Standard opining that her music "taps into a shared queer history of escape, possibility, and disappointment", likening her to Kylie Minogue.

NPR called Emotion a "modern touchstone", by which they compared the Aces and Paramore's After Laughter (2017) to. In developing her EP Now That the Light Is Fading, Maggie Rogers resolved to make pop music after being inspired by Emotion. Jay Som counts Jepsen as a notable influence on her debut album Everybody Works: "I felt very assertive with [Everybody Works] because I was also listening to her music. I liked how energetic and youthful the spirit is—and it's just so not ashamed to be this pop record." A tribute album was released digitally by Something Merry on November 21, 2018. The album is a track-by-track cover of Emotion, including covers made by Wild Pink, Cheer Up, Future Teens, Gabe Goodman, Good Looking Friends, Kiki Maddog, Lilith, Mandancing, oldsoul, Photocomfort, Pushflowers, the Aux, the Superweaks, Tuft.

Track listingNotes'''
  Although credited as 'The Trinity', the members of the band Haim are the names behind this pseudonym.
  signifies an additional producer

Personnel
Credits per the liner notes of Emotion''.

Music

Noonie Bao – backing vocals 
CJ Baran – all instruments 
Rostam Batmanglij – keyboards, piano 
Ajay Bhattacharyya – synths 
Peter Carlsson – solina 
Samuel Dixon – electric guitar, acoustic guitar, bass guitar, synths 
Carl Falk – instruments, guitars 
Ethan Farmer – bass 
Wojtek Goral – saxophone 
Oscar Görres – backing vocals 
Zachary Gray – bass, synths 
Jeff Halatrax – drums, synths, keyboards, bass 
Svante Halldin – violin 
Oscar Holter – backing vocals 
Devonté Hynes – guitars 
Wouter Janssen – all instruments 
Carly Rae Jepsen – lead vocals, backing vocals 
Jakob Jerlström – backing vocals 
Tommy King – keyboards 
Daniel Farrugia  - keyboards, piano  
Greg Kurstin – bass, drums, guitar, keyboards 
Katerina Loules – backing vocals 
Lukas "Lulou" Loules – all instruments 
Roger Manning, Jr. – synthesizers 
Mattman & Robin – backing vocals, bass, drums, percussion ; guitars ; vocoder, synths 
Missy Modell – backing vocals 
Daniel Nigro – guitar 
Emre Ramazanoglu – synths, percussion, drums 
Rami – instruments, bass 
Ariel Rechtshaid – synthesizers, percussion 
Sibel Redžep – backing vocals 
Ben Romans – all instruments 
Ludvig Söderberg – backing vocals 
Marlene Strand – backing vocals 
Peter Svensson – drums, synths, keyboards, bass, guitar 
Greg Wells – drums, synths

Production

Henrique Andrade – engineering assistance 
CJ Baran – production, programming 
Rostam Batmanglij – production, engineering, drum and synth programming 
Ajay Bhattacharyya – production, recording, drum programming 
Mikaelin 'Blue' Bluespruce – recording 
Mario Borgatta – mixing assistance 
Julian Burg – engineering 
Martin Cooke – engineering assistance 
Rich Costey – mixing 
Tom Coyne – mastering 
John DeBold – engineering assistance 
Samuel Dixon – programming 
Micky Evelyn – engineering assistance 
Eric Eylands – engineering assistance 
Carl Falk – production, programming 
Nicholas Fournier – engineering assistance 
Kyle Gaffney – engineering assistance 
Chris Galland – mixing assistance 
Serban Ghenea – mixing 
Zachary Gray – production, recording 
Gene Grimaldi – mastering 
Josh Gudwin – vocal production, vocal recording 
Jeff Halatrax – production, engineering, programming 
John Hanes – mix engineering 
The High Street – production 
Devonté Hynes – production, programming 
Chris Kasych – engineering 
Greg Kurstin – production, engineering 
Lukas "Lulou" Loules – production, engineering, mixing 
Eric Madrid – mixing 
Manny Marroquin – mixing 
Mattman & Robin – production ; programming 
Mitch McCarthy – mixing 
Scott Moore – engineering 
Daniel Nigro – additional production, programming 
Robert Orton – mixing 
Alex Pasco – engineering 
Noah Passovoy – additional vocal recording 
Emre Ramazanoglu – programming 
Rami – production, programming 
Ariel Rechtshaid – production, programming ; recording ; engineering, drum programming 
Ben Romans – production, programming 
Will Sandalls – engineering 
Matt Schaeffer – engineering assistance 
Ike Schultz – mixing assistance 
Wesley Seidman – recording 
Kyle Shearer – production 
Shellback – production 
Laura Sisk – additional engineering 
Stint – production 
Shane Stoneback – engineering 
Peter Svensson – production, engineering, programming 
Juan Carlos Torrado – engineering assistance 
Randy Urbanski – engineering 
Jaime Velez – engineering assistance 
Robert Vosgien – mastering 
Vincent Vu – mixing assistance 
Greg Wells – production, programming 
Wired Masters – mastering

Business

Scott "Scooter" Braun – executive production, A&R, management
Greg Carr – marketing coordination
Lisa DiAngelo – publicity
John Ehmann – A&R
David Gray – A&R
Pamela Gurley – legal representation
Brad Haugen – marketing, creative direction
Laura Hess – management, marketing
Dyana Kass – marketing
Allison Kaye – management
Steve Kopec – management
Evan Lamberg – A&R
Kenny Meiselas – legal representation
Katherine Neiss – A&R coordination
Olivia Zaro – A&R

Packaging
Jessica Severn – art direction and design
Karla Welch – styling
Matthew Welch – photography

Charts

Weekly charts

Year-end charts

Certifications

Release history

References

2015 albums
604 Records albums
Albums produced by Greg Kurstin
Albums produced by Rami Yacoub
Albums produced by Rostam Batmanglij
Albums produced by Shellback (record producer)
Albums produced by Mattman & Robin
Albums produced by Dev Hynes
Albums produced by Ariel Rechtshaid
Albums produced by Greg Wells
Carly Rae Jepsen albums
Interscope Records albums